Chandrika  may refer to:

Media
Chandrika (film)
Chandrika (newspaper)

People
Chandrika (Kannada actress)
Chandrika Balan (Chandramathi), Indian writer
Chandrika Kumaratunga, former Sri Lankan President
Chandrika Prasad Srivastava, Indian diplomat
Chandrika Ravi, Indian Australian model and actress
Rajendra Chandrika, West Indian cricket wicketkeeper and opening batsman
Udaya Chandrika, Kannada actress

Other uses
Chandrika (soap)

Feminine given names